Nilu Dolma Sherpa (1985 – 1 July 2017) was a Nepali film director. She directed the film How Funny, and earned accolades for her short title, kagaj. She died in 2017 due to cardiac arrest.

Filmography

Death 
Nilu was found unconscious in her home in Baluwatar. She was taken to TU Teaching Hospital, where she was pronounced dead.

Legacy 
After the death of Sherpa there has been a Scholarship announced in the memory of the Sherpa.

References

1985 births
2017 deaths
Nepalese film directors
People from Kathmandu District
Nepalese women film producers
Nepalese Buddhists